Colin Patrick Harper (born August 21, 1981), better known by his stage name Collie Buddz, is a Bermudian
reggae artist best known for his single "Come Around".

Career
Harper was born in New Orleans, Louisiana to a Bermudian mother and he was raised in Bermuda. He studied audio engineering with Noah Zamudio at Full Sail University in Winter Park, Florida. His name is based on slang for cannabis, and he has been photographed flaunting a device commonly used for its consumption.

Buddz performed on Shaggy's 2007 studio album Intoxication on the track "Mad Mad World".

Self-titled album
On June 7, 2007, he released his debut self-titled album on Columbia and Sony BMG. It included his first  single "Come Around" and second single "Blind To You". However, his greatest radio success was "Mamacita", which boasted sales of approximately 4 million copies thanks to this hit single.

Buddz is well known for his 2007 hit "Blind to You" and performing the song on stage with a guest from the audience who he calls on stage to sing the "Third Verse". One of his more memorable on stage guests was a man he dubbed "Big Jerry" who he brought on stage during Cali Roots X.

After his debut album, Buddz launched his own record label 'Harper Digital Entertainment'.

Touring and EP's
In 2008, he performed his song "S.O.S." on WWE The Music, Vol. 8 as the entrance theme for wrestler Kofi Kingston. He also appeared in a 2009 remix of Kid Cudi's single "Day 'n' Nite". 

Buddz released his first EP, Playback on July 12, 2012. It featured eight tracks with different producers such as Baby Dee Beats, Green Lion, Homegrown Kush, Seani B, Star Kutt, Supa Dups, and TJ Records.

In 2013, he was a featured act with Rebelution, Matisyahu, and Zion Thompson of The Green on the Good Vibes Tour. Buddz' festival appearances include Lollapalooza, Outside Lands, Hot 97 Summer Jam, Reggae on the Rocks, California Roots Music and Arts Festival, UCLA JazzReggae, Seattle City Arts festival, Manifestivus, and the Marley Family's 9 Mile Music Festival, among others.

Buddz released his second EP, Blue Dreamz on May 1, 2015, which featured seven new tracks.

Good Life and Hybrid
He released his third studio album Good Life on May 19, 2017 via Harper Digital Entertainment. It features guest appearances from Snoop Dogg, Jody Highroller (AKA Riff Raff), Kat Dahlia, Kreesha Turner, and P-Lo. The album peaked at #1 on the US Billboard Reggae Albums chart and #29 on the Independent Albums chart.

His third studio album Hybrid, which released on May 24, 2019 via Harper Digital topped the Billboard reggae albums chart, #70 on the Billboard 200 and #20 on the Independent Albums chart. The album features special guests, B Young, Dizzy Wright, Johnny Cosmic, Russ, Stonebwoy and Tech N9ne.

Cali Roots Riddim
Buddz released his own Riddim album, Cali Roots Riddim 2020 on May 22, 2020. He produced all 22 tracks and worked with Stick Figure guitarist and reggae artist/producer Johnny Cosmic who mixed and also produced the tracks. The compilation made it to #7 on Billboard Reggae Albums chart. The album features one riddim or rhythm that includes the top reggae rock artists' performing their interpretation of it, including Collie Buddz himself. Some of the bands featured are Arise Roots, Bumpin Uglies, Common Kings, The Elovaters, The Expendables, Giant Panda Guerilla Dub Squad, Iya Terra, The Movement, Ozomatli, Pepper, SOJA, and Yellowman, among others.

He released another riddim compilation, Cali Roots Riddim 2021 on May 28, 2021 with 27 tracks; once again mixed and additional produced by Johnny Cosmic. It features top reggae/rock bands such as Alborosie, Atmosphere, Ballyhoo!, The Expanders, Groundation, Iration, Josh Heinrichs, KBong, New Kingston, Passafire, Through The Roots, Tropidelic, and many more.

Discography

Studio albums

Extended plays (EPs)

Compilations (Riddims)

Promos (Mixtapes)

Singles

References

External links
 Official website
 Collie Buddz at Imusictweet.com
 Bernews: Collie Buddz Bio, Photo Gallery, Videos

1981 births
Living people
Reggae fusion artists
Dancehall musicians
Soca musicians
Bermudian reggae musicians
Musicians from New Orleans
American reggae musicians
American hip hop singers
Singers from Louisiana
21st-century American singers